Arbouet may refer to:
Arbouet-Sussaute, a commune in south-western France
Kevin Arbouet (born 1977), American film director